Viscum capense (common name, Cape mistletoe) is a species of Mistletoe that is indigenous to South Africa, especially the area from Cape Town, northwards along the coast up to Namibia, and eastwards as far as the Eastern Cape province.

This parasitic plant has jointed stems, vestigial leaves in the form of small scales around the stem nodes, and tiny yellowish-green flowers that produce translucent pale berries. The fruit is dispersed by birds. The plant is poisonous but is nonetheless used in traditional African medicine, the plant being boiled to make a tea that is used to soothe asthma. It is dioecious, with male and female flowers on separate plants.

References

capense
Parasitic plants
Flora of the Cape Provinces
Flora of Namibia
Plants used in traditional African medicine
Dioecious plants